The 1990 FIVB Volleyball World League was the first edition of the annual men's international volleyball tournament, played by 8 countries from 27 April to 15 July 1990. The Final Round was held in Osaka, Japan.

Pools composition

Intercontinental round

Pool A

|}

|}

Pool B

|}

|}

Final round
Venue:  Osaka Prefectural Gymnasium, Osaka, Japan

Semifinals

|}

3rd place match

|}

Final

|}

Final standing

Awards
Most Valuable Player
  Andrea Zorzi
Best Spiker
  Ron Zwerver
Best Blocker
  Andrea Gardini
Best Setter
  Paolo Tofoli

External links

World League History – official website
1990 World League results 

FIVB Volleyball World League
FIVB World League
Volleyball
FIVB World League